Heligoland Airport   (also known as Helgoland Airfield) is an airfield on the German island of Düne, the smaller of the two isles of the Heligoland archipelago in the North Sea, about  from the mainland.

History
The first military airfield on Düne existed during World War II when Heligoland had been fortified. In 1962, the airport was rebuilt into the form it still has today.

From 2005 to 2006, the main runway (direction 15/33) was extended from 400 m to 480 m for compliance with EU regulations on commercial air traffic.

Facilities
Due to the limited length of the runways and adverse wind conditions, the approach to and departure from the airport is demanding, requiring experience and special preparation from pilots. For commercial flights, prior training is mandatory.

Airlines and destinations

The following airlines offer regular scheduled and charter flights at Heligoland Airport:

Ground transportation
A ferryboat service connects Düne to the Heligoland main island; there is a single taxi that services the short distance between the airport and ferryboat terminals. In general, motor vehicles and bicycles are prohibited on the archipelago.

See also
 Transport in Germany
 List of airports in Germany
 List of shortest runways

References

External links

 Official website
 

Airport
Airports in Schleswig-Holstein